Méganne Perry Mélançon (born May 10, 1990) is a Canadian politician, who was elected to the National Assembly of Quebec in the 2018 provincial election. She represented the electoral district of Gaspé as a member of the Parti Québécois until her defeat in the 2022 Quebec general election.

On election night, Perry Mélançon was declared to have been defeated by Alexandre Boulay of the Quebec Liberal Party. She was found to have defeated Boulay by a margin of 41 votes after a recount.

Electoral record

References

1990 births
Living people
French Quebecers
Parti Québécois MNAs
People from Gaspé, Quebec
Women MNAs in Quebec
21st-century Canadian women politicians